The Medjidi Tabia Fortress is a fortress from the 1840s and early 1850s.

The fortress was built in the period 1841-1853 according to the plans of the German military engineer Helmut von Moltke who visited Silistra in 1837. In 1847 it was visited by Sultan Abdulmejid I, whose name is called — Majidi Tabia.

In 1854, during the Crimean War, the fortress withstood a month-long Russian siege — Siege of Silistria.

Gallery

References

External links
 Medzhidi Tabiya Fortress – Town of Silistra

Forts in Bulgaria
History of Silistra
Ottoman fortifications
Ottoman architecture in Bulgaria